

Mount Meru is a dormant stratovolcano located  west of Mount Kilimanjaro in southeast Arusha Region, Tanzania.

Mount Meru is located just north of the city of Arusha, in the Arusha Region of Tanzania. It is the second-highest mountain in Tanzania, after Mount Kilimanjaro. Mount Meru is also the highest mountain/point in Arusha Region. The Momella route – which starts at Momella gate, on the eastern side of the mountain – is used to climb Mount Meru.

Much of its bulk was lost about 7,800 years ago due to a summit collapse. Mount Meru most recently had a minor eruption in 1910. The several small cones and craters seen in the vicinity probably reflect numerous episodes of volcanic activity.

Mount Meru is the topographic centerpiece of Arusha National Park. Its fertile slopes rise above the surrounding savanna and support a forest that hosts diverse wildlife, including nearly 400 species of birds, and also monkeys and leopards.

The movie Hatari! was filmed at the foot of Mountain Meru.

Gallery

See also
 Geography of Tanzania
 List of volcanoes in Tanzania
 List of Ultras of Africa

References

External links
 
 Mount Meru Climb Information
 Satellite pictures of Mount Meru
 trekkingvisions Information about the Mount Meru Trek

 
East African montane forests
Mountains of Tanzania
Stratovolcanoes of Tanzania
Active volcanoes
Geography of Arusha Region
Four-thousanders of Africa